The Western Design Center (WDC) W65C265S is a 16-bit CMOS microcontroller based on a W65C816S processor core, which is a superset of the MOS Technology 6502 processor.

The W65C265S consists of a fully static W65C816S CPU core, 8 KB of ROM containing a machine language monitor, 576 bytes of SRAM, a processor cache under software control, eight 16-bit timers with maskable interrupts, an interrupt-driven parallel bus (PIB), four universal asynchronous receiver-transmitters (UARTs), a watchdog timer that fires a restart interrupt, twenty-nine priority encoded interrupts, a time-of-day clock, two sound generators, a bus control register (BCR) for external memory bus control, interface circuitry for peripheral devices, ABORT input for low cost virtual memory interface, and many low power features.

Features
 Hi-Rel low power CMOS process 
 Operating ambient temperature range is 0 °C to +70 °C 
 Single 2.8 V to 5.5 V power supply 
 Static to 8 MHz clock operation, as well as 32.768KHz capability 
 W65C816S compatible CPU
 16 MB linear address space 
 Twenty-nine priority encoded interrupts 
 Four UARTS's 
 Time of Day (ToD) clock features 
 8 x 16 bit timer/counters 
 Bus Control Register 
 Many bus operating features and modes 
 8 Programmable chip select outputs 
 Low cost surface mount 84 and 100 lead packages 
 Automatically shifts speed for slow memory or peripherals

See also
 WDC 65C134 - an 8-bit microcontroller based around a WDC 65C02 processor core

References

Further reading

External links 
 W65C265S website - Western Design Center (WDC)
 W65C265S datasheet - WDC
 W65C265S monitor ROM manual - WDC

65xx microprocessors
16-bit microprocessors